is one of the official 29 grappling techniques of Kodokan Judo. It is one of the nine joint techniques of the Kansetsu-waza list, one of the three grappling lists in Judo's Katame-waza enumerating 29 grappling techniques.
 All of Judo's competition legal joint techniques are arm locks.

Technique Description 
Hiza refers to knee. Gatame refers to pin. This technique is using the knee to joint lock and pin the opponent. Once the opponent is face down an arm bar can be applied using the knee on the opponents elbow, the opponents hand must be pinky up. Upwards pressure can be applied on the wrist while downward pressure is applied with the knee on the elbow. The inside of the knee area can also be used to torque the elbow/shoulder from a bottom transition.

Technique History

Similar Techniques, Variants, and Aliases 
Variants
Sankaku garami(Omoplata)
Reverse Omoplata
V-cross armlock
 

IJF Official Aliases:
U.H. hiza gatame
Hiza gatame(膝固)

Variants or Aliases
Ude-Hishigi-Betsu-Gata
Ude-Hishigi-Betsu-Gata is also described in The Canon Of Judo, this technique is similar to the second variation below, Ude-Hishigi-Ude-Gatame-Ni, except that Uke remains on their feet while Tori wraps one of his legs around Uke's arm.
Hiza gatame ude kujiki
Ude gatame ude kujiki
Tachiai ude kujiki

Included Systems 
Systems:
Kodokan Judo, Judo Lists
Lists:
The Canon Of Judo
Judo technique
The video, The Essence of Judo featuring Kyuzo Mifune
Hiza gatame ude kujiki
Ude gatame ude kujiki (2nd pattern, 4th pattern)
Tachiai ude kujiki

References

External links
Mifune's Goshin Jutsu

Judo technique